Pachyrhynchus obumanuvu is a species of Easter egg weevil discovered in 2021. The species has an iridescent scarlet and green-black markings has coloring reminiscent of the Obu Manuvu's traditional garments. P. obumanuvu is endangered due to deforestation but more specifically in the western side of Mindanao.

Naming 
Pachyrhynchus obumanuvu was named after the Obu Manuvu tribe in Davao city by researchers from the University of Mindanao due to the coloration of the exoskeleton.

Discovery 
Pachyrhynchus obumanuvu was discovered by researchers from the University of Mindanao, California Academy of Sciences and the Euro Generics International Philippines Foundation.

References 

Curculionidae
Insects of the Philippines
Beetles described in 2021